Longitarsus pellucidus is a species of flea beetle in the family Chrysomelidae. It is found in Europe and Northern Asia (excluding China) and North America.

References

Further reading

 
 

Longitarsus
Articles created by Qbugbot
Beetles described in 1859